Henrique Kranen (26 July 1911 – 30 January 1974) was a Brazilian rower. He competed in the men's eight event at the 1936 Summer Olympics.

References

External links
 

1911 births
1974 deaths
Brazilian male rowers
Olympic rowers of Brazil
Rowers at the 1936 Summer Olympics
Sportspeople from Rio Grande do Sul